Pentaedrusaurus (meaning "pentagonal [skull] lizard") is an extinct genus of procolophonid parareptile from the Early Triassic of China. It is one of the most basal members of the procolophonid subfamily Leptopleuroninae. The only known species of Pentaedrusaurus, P. ordosianus, was named in 1989 from the Heshanggou Formation.

References

Leptopleuronines
Triassic parareptiles
Early Triassic reptiles of Asia
Prehistoric reptile genera